National Highway 52 (NH 52), Sangrur, Punjab to Ankola, Karnataka, is a National Highway in India. The national highway 52 was numbered after amalgamating many existing national highways of India. The old highway numbered NH-63 was from Ankola in Karnataka state to Gooty in Andhra pradesh state. The highway 52 starts at the junction of National Highway 66 (old number NH-17) at Ankola and moves up to Arebail ghat of Western ghats and then to Yellapura and further to Hubballi (Hubli) city. Some stretch of old national highway 13 from Vijayapura ( old name Bijapur) to Solapur was joined with NH-52. Lorries coming Hubballi city to Karwar sea port and New Mangalore sea port (NMPT) use this highway.The road stretch from Ankola to Yellapura is through forests of Western ghats of India.

Major cities

Punjab
 Sangrur, Dirba, Pattran

Haryana
 Narwana, barwala Hisar, Siwani (Jhumpa)

Rajasthan
 Sadulpur, Churu, Ramgarh, Sikar, Fatehpur, Laxmangarh, Sikar, Palsana, Ringas, Chomu, Jaipur, Tonk, Bundi, Talera, Kota, Jhalawar, Aklera

Madhya Pradesh
Rajgarh, Biora, Dewas, Indore, Sendhwa

Maharashtra
 [[Dhule]
 Chalisgaon, Kannad, Aurangabad, Georai, Beed, Chausala, Osmanabad, Tulajapur, Solapur

Karnataka
 Dhulakhed,Zalki, Horti, Basanal Cross, Agasanal, Bijapur, Kolhar, Bilagi, Gaddanakeri Cross, Bagalkot, Kerur, Nargund, Navalgund, Hubli, Kalaghatagi, Yellapura, Ramanaguli, Ankola

See also
 National Highway 66 (India)
 National Highway 75 (India)
 National Highway 73 (India)
 National Highway 169 (India)
 National Highway 275 (India)
 Ghat Roads

References

National highways in India
National Highways in Haryana
National Highways in Karnataka